In vino veritas is a Latin phrase that means "In wine, there is truth", suggesting a person under the influence of alcohol is more likely to speak their hidden thoughts and desires. The phrase is sometimes continued as, "In vīnō vēritās, in aquā sānitās", i.e., "In wine there is truth, in water there is good sense (or good health)." Similar phrases exist across cultures and languages.

The expression, together with its counterpart in Greek, "Ἐν οἴνῳ ἀλήθεια" (En oinō alētheia), is found in Erasmus' Adagia, I.vii.17. Pliny the Elder's Naturalis historia contains an early allusion to the phrase. The Greek expression is quoted by Athenaeus of Naucratis in his Deipnosophistae; it is now traced back to a poem by Alcaeus.

Herodotus asserts that if the Persians decided something while drunk, they made a rule to reconsider it when sober. Authors after Herodotus have added that if the Persians made a decision while sober, they made a rule to reconsider it when they were drunk (Histories, book 1, section 133). The Roman historian Tacitus described how the Germanic peoples kept counsel at feasts, where they believed that drunkenness prevented the participants from dissembling.

Western Europe 

In Western European countries the same idea has been incorporated in local language versions.
 In Danish, "Fra børn og fulde folk skal man høre sandheden" ("From children and drunk people, you will hear the truth").
 In Dutch, similarly, "Kinderen en dronkaards spreken de waarheid" ("Children and drunk people speak the truth"), "De wijn in het lijf, het hart in de mond" ("Wine in the body, heart in the mouth"), and "Een dronken mond spreekt 's harten grond"  ("A drunken mouth speaks from the bottom of the heart").
 In English, "What soberness conceals, drunkenness reveals" and "He speaks in his drink what he thought in his drouth", and "A drunk man's words are a sober man's thoughts".
 In Finnish, "Kännisen suusta totuus tulee" ("The truth comes from the mouth of a drunkard").
 In French, "Ce que le sobre tient au cœur est sur la langue du buveur" ("What the sober hold in their heart is on the drinker's tongue").
 In German, "Trunkner Mund verrät des Herzens Grund" ("A drunken mouth reveals the heart's meaning") and "Trunkener Mund tut Wahrheit kund" ("A drunken mouth proclaims the truth").
 In Icelandic, "Öl er innri maður" (Ale reveals the inner man).
 In Spanish, "Despues de beber cada uno dice su parecer" ("After drinking everyone speaks their opinion"), "Cuando el vino entra, echa el secreto afuera" ("When the wine enters, it throws the secret out"), and "Los niños y los borrachos dicen la verdad" ("Children and drunk people speak the truth").

Central Europe 

 Polish: W winie prawda.
Czech: Ve víně je pravda.
Hungarian: Borban az igazság
Romanian: în vin este adevărul.
Serbian: Пијан говори што трезан мисли.
Slovak: Vo víne je pravda.
Slovene: V vinu je resnica.
Russian, «Что у трезвого на уме, то у пьяного на языке»  ("What a sober man has in his mind, the drunk one has on his tongue") and «Истина в вине».

Asia

Persian
In Persian, مستی و راستی ("drunkenness and truthfulness").

Chinese
In Chinese,  ("After wine blurts truthful speech").

Filipino
In Tagalog, Nasa Inuman ang Katotohanan ("Truth is in Drinking").

Japanese
In Japanese, 酒は本心を表す (Sake wa honshin o arawasu, "Alcohol reveals true feelings").

Talmud
The Babylonian Talmud (תלמוד בבלי) contains the passage:  "נכנס יין יצא סוד", i.e., "Wine enters, secret goes out." It continues, "בשלשה דברים אדם ניכר בכוסו ובכיסו ובכעסו", i.e., "In three things is a man revealed: in his wine goblet, in his purse, and in his wrath." (In the original Hebrew, the words for "his goblet" (koso), "his purse" (keeso - lit. his pocket), and "his wrath" (ka'aso) rhyme, and there is a further play on words, as they all use the root "כס".) 

In Hebrew Gematria, the value of the word "sod" (secret) is equal to the value of the word "yain" (wine), making it another play on words, of something of value enters, and something of equal value exits. 

There is a similar saying in yiddish: "וואס בײַ א ניכטערן אויף די לינג, איז בײַ א שיכור'ן אויף די צינג", literal meaning: what a sober one has on its lung a drunken has on its tongue.

Africa
In Chichewa, Phika mowa unve chinapha amako ("Brew beer and you will hear what killed your mother").

In Chibemba, Ubwalwa nisokolola twebo ("Beer makes one reveal secrets")

In Tetela, Olamba háté kashi (Alcohol does not lie)

In  Ewe ,  Gnatepe le kopo'a me   (Truth lies in the cup)

Music
In the 1770s, Benjamin Cooke wrote a glee by the title of In Vino Veritas. His lyrics (with modern punctuation):

See also 
 List of Latin phrases
 Truth serum

References

External links

Latin proverbs
Latin words and phrases
Wine